Khajuri Kalan is a village in Koraon Tehsil in Allahabad District, Uttar Pradesh, India. It is about 1.5 km by road south of the village of Pathertal, and about 1.5 km by road north of the village of Khajuri Khurd. Administratively, it is under the gram panchayat of Khajuri Khurd.

In the 2001 census, the village of Khajuri Kalan had a population of 973, with 498 males and 475 females.

Notes

Villages in Allahabad district